Belinda Brooks  (born 3 February 1977) was an Australian female water polo player. She was a member of the Australia women's national water polo team, playing as a centre back. She is a Triathlete.

She was a part of the  team at the 2004 Summer Olympics. On club level she played for Fremantle Marlins in Australia.

References

External links
 

1977 births
Living people
Australian female water polo players
Water polo players at the 2004 Summer Olympics
Olympic water polo players of Australia
Sportspeople from Perth, Western Australia
21st-century Australian women
20th-century Australian women